The following is a timeline of the first premiership of Winston Churchill, who was the Prime Minister of the United Kingdom from 1940 to 1945 and again from 1951 to 1955. Churchill served as the Prime Minister of the United Kingdom during the bulk of World War II. His speeches and radio broadcasts helped inspire British resistance, especially during the difficult days of 1940–41 when the British Commonwealth and Empire stood almost alone in its active opposition to Nazi Germany. He led Britain as Prime Minister until victory over Nazi Germany had been secured.

After the Conservative Party lost the 1945 election, Churchill became Leader of the Opposition to the Labour Government. He would go on to be re-elected as Prime Minister in 1951.

1940

April

May

June

August

October

November

1941

February

April

June

July

August

December

1942

February

April

May

June

July

August

November

December

1943

January

May

July

August

October

November

1944

February

June

August

September

October

December

1945

February

April

May 
 
 23 May 1945: Wartime coalition ends. Start of brief caretaker government.

June
5 June 1945:  The longest parliament of the 20th century is dissolved.

July

See also
 British Empire in World War II
 Military history of the United Kingdom during World War II
 List of Allied World War II conferences

References

Further reading
 Addison, Paul. The road to 1945: British politics and the Second World War (1975; 2nd ed. 2010), a standard scholarly history of wartime politics.
 Addison, Paul. Churchill on the Home Front, 1900–1955 (1992) ch 10–11.
 Crowcroft, Robert. "‘Making a Reality of Collective Responsibility’: The Lord President's Committee, Coalition and the British State at War, 1941–42." Contemporary British History 29.4 (2015): 539–562.  online
 Pelling, Henry. "The 1945 general election reconsidered." Historical Journal  (1980) 23(2) pp: 399–414. online
 Smart, Nick. British strategy and politics during the phony war: before the balloon went up (Greenwood, 2003).
 Todman, David. Britain's War: 1937–1941  (vol 1, Oxford UP, 2016); 828pp; comprehensive coverage of home front, military, and diplomatic developments; Excerpt

Winston Churchill
Churchill
Chronology of World War II